Cédric Taymans (born 11 April 1975) is a Belgian judoka.

Achievements

References

External links 
 
 
 

1975 births
Living people
Belgian male judoka
Judoka at the 2000 Summer Olympics
Olympic judoka of Belgium
20th-century Belgian people
21st-century Belgian people